Dunstan was a parliamentary electorate in the Otago region of New Zealand, from 1871 to 1890.

History
The Dunstan electorate was created in 1871 for the 5th Parliament. The first elected representative was Thomas Luther Shepherd, who won the 1871 general election. He retired at the end of the term in December 1875. Vincent Pyke succeeded him in 1876 and held the electorate until its abolition in 1890.

Members of Parliament
Dunstan was represented by two MPs:

Key

Notes

References

Historical electorates of New Zealand
1870 establishments in New Zealand
1890 disestablishments in New Zealand